Kal'vets Rock is a rock outcrop lying  west-southwest of the summit of Mount Flånuten on the west side of the Humboldt Mountains, Queen Maud Land, Antarctica. It was discovered and plotted from air photos by the Third German Antarctic Expedition, 1938–39, and mapped from air photos and surveys by the Sixth Norwegian Antarctic Expedition, 1956–60. It was remapped by the Soviet Antarctic Expedition, 1960–61, and named after Soviet pilot O.A. Kal'vets.

References

Rock formations of Queen Maud Land
Humboldt Mountains (Antarctica)